Ergun or Ergün may refer to:

Places
Ergun, Inner Mongolia, China
Argun River (Asia), part of the Sino-Russian border

Given name
Ergun Caner (born 1966), Swedish-American academic, author, and Baptist minister
Ergün Penbe (born 1972), Turkish football player
Ergün Teber (born 1985), Turkish football player
Ergün Zorlu (born 1985), Turkish tennis player

Surname
Halil Ergün (born 1946), Turkish actor
Sabri Ergun (1918–2006), Turkish chemical engineer
Zeynep Ergun (born 1956), Turkish linguist

Turkish-language surnames
Turkish masculine given names